In enzymology, a quercetin 3-O-methyltransferase is an enzyme that catalyzes the chemical reaction

S-adenosyl-L-methionine + 3,5,7,3',4'-pentahydroxyflavone  S-adenosyl-L-homocysteine + 3-methoxy-5,7,3',4'-tetrahydroxyflavone

Thus, the two substrates of this enzyme are S-adenosyl methionine and 3,5,7,3',4'-pentahydroxyflavone, whereas its two products are S-adenosylhomocysteine and 3-methoxy-5,7,3',4'-tetrahydroxyflavone.

This enzyme belongs to the family of transferases, specifically those transferring one-carbon group methyltransferases.  The systematic name of this enzyme class is S-adenosyl-L-methionine:3,5,7,3',4'-pentahydroxyflavone 3-O-methyltransferase. Other names in common use include flavonol 3-O-methyltransferase, and flavonoid 3-methyltransferase.  This enzyme participates in flavonoid biosynthesis.

References

 
 
 
 

EC 2.1.1
Enzymes of unknown structure
Quercetin
Flavonols metabolism
O-methylated flavonoids metabolism